Germaine Rouer (1897–1994) was a French stage and film actress. She was a member of the Comédie-Française.

Selected filmography
 Les Vampires (1916)
 The Earth (1921)
 The Bread Peddler (1923)
 The Flame (1926)
 The Good Reputation (1926)
 Cousin Bette (1928)
 Roger la Honte (1933)
 The Two Boys (1936)
 The Drunkard (1937)
 Royal Affairs in Versailles (1954)

References

Bibliography
 Goble, Alan. The Complete Index to Literary Sources in Film. Walter de Gruyter, 1999.

External links

1897 births
1994 deaths
French film actresses
French silent film actresses
20th-century French actresses
French stage actresses
Actresses from Paris